Thiago Motta (born 28 August 1982) is an Italian-Brazilian professional football manager and former player. He is currently the head coach of  club Bologna.  

A midfielder, Motta spent his early career at Barcelona, where he was injury-prone. He played two and a half seasons with Inter Milan before joining Paris Saint-Germain in January 2012, winning 27 major titles all clubs combined. Motta also had brief spells with Atlético Madrid in Spain, and Genoa in Italy.

Born in Brazil, Motta also holds Italian citizenship. After making two appearances for his country of birth in 2003, he represented the latter national team a total of 30 times since making his debut in 2011, scoring once. He appeared at the 2014 FIFA World Cup and two European Championships with Italy, finishing second at Euro 2012.

Following his retirement in 2018, he coached the under-19 side of Paris Saint-Germain. In October 2019, he was appointed as Genoa's new manager, being fired in December following a poor run of results.

In July 2021, Motta was appointed as Spezia Calcio manager, where he remained for one season. He then took over as manager of Bologna in September 2022.

Early life
Motta was born in São Bernardo do Campo, São Paulo.

Club career

Barcelona

Motta signed with FC Barcelona in 1999 at age 17 from São Paulo side Clube Atlético Juventus, initially being assigned to the club's B-side. He eventually graduated to the first team in 2001, making his official debut on 3 October against RCD Mallorca in a 3–0 home win.

In the 2001–02 edition of the UEFA Champions League, Motta made seven appearances and helped his team to the semi-finals. In 2002–03's La Liga he appeared in a career-best 21 games (with three goals) as Barça could only finish in sixth position, and also played an important part in the following season's long UEFA Cup run, which was eventually ended by Celtic; in the first leg, a 0–1 loss in Glasgow (0–1 on aggregate), he was sent off during half-time after hitting out at opposing goalkeeper Robert Douglas who was also shown the red card, in an incident that happened in the tunnel.

Motta was also dogged by several injuries, particularly one suffered on 11 September 2004 against Sevilla FC, which sidelined him for seven months, during his time at Barcelona. He would eventually need surgery to rebuild the anterior cruciate and lateral ligaments in his left knee, but was able to make a swift recovery and made an emotional comeback, taking to the field to rapturous applause as eventual league champions defeated Getafe CF 2–0 on 17 April.

Atlético Madrid
In late August 2007, Motta signed a one-year contract with Atlético Madrid for an undisclosed fee. Once again he began the season on the sidelines, injured; in the Copa del Rey quarter-final match against Valencia CF he was ejected after only 25 minutes, and the Colchoneros lost the away fixture 0–1 and subsequently the tie.

Due to injury to regular starter Raúl García and the departure of Maniche in January 2008, Motta's opportunities increased. In March, however, the recurrent knee problems reappeared and his season was over, followed by a successful surgery and rehabilitation in the United States; he trialled with Premier League side Portsmouth after his release, but did not sign for them.

Genoa

In September 2008, Motta joined Genoa on a free transfer, after passing a medical. During his debut campaign he performed consistently well and was a regular in the starting eleven, under coach Gian Piero Gasperini.

On 11 April 2009, Motta scored two goals (one of them in the first half's injury time) in a final 3–2 home victory over Juventus FC. He finished the year with a career-best six goals, and his team qualified for the Europa League.

Inter Milan
On 20 May 2009, La Gazzetta dello Sport confirmed that Motta, alongside teammate Diego Milito, transferred to Inter Milan, who paid €28 million for the latter and €10.2 million for the former while as part of the deal, Genoa received five Inter players: Robert Acquafresca, Francesco Bolzoni, Leonardo Bonucci, Ivan Fatić and Riccardo Meggiorini. Motta's agent, Dario Canovi, later revealed that his Genoa contract with the club included a buy-out fee of €10 million.

Motta's debut came in 2009–10's opener, a 1–1 home draw against A.S. Bari, and his first goal came the next round as he opened the score in the Derby della Madonnina after an assist by Milito, in the 4–0 defeat of A.C. Milan. Having been in and out of the team for the duration of the season, he netted his first brace for them in a 3–0 win over Bologna F.C. 1909 on 3 April 2010.

Motta also appeared in eight games during the club's victorious Champions League campaign, including the 0–1 loss at former side Barcelona in the semi-finals (3–2 aggregate win). During that match, he was sent off after apparently striking Sergio Busquets in the face with his hand; the incident gathered attention due to Busquets' apparent feigning of injury.

On 23 October 2011, from a corner taken by Wesley Sneijder, Motta scored through a header in a 1–0 victory against A.C. ChievoVerona, which was Inter's first at home in 2011–12.

Paris Saint-Germain
On 31 January 2012, in spite of Inter manager Claudio Ranieri indicating shortly before he was confident the player would remain with the club until the end of the season, having called him to the upcoming league match against U.S. Città di Palermo, Motta signed with Paris Saint-Germain F.C. in France, for a fee believed to be around €10 million. Following his move, he revealed that he dreamt of playing for the club ever since fellow Brazilians such as Raí, Leonardo and Ronaldinho shone in the French capital; he also revealed that he was not happy at Inter, refusing to further elaborate on his reasons to leave.

Four days after signing for the club, Motta made his debut for PSG, against Evian in a 3–1 home win, being booked in the process. On 22 April 2012, in another home fixture, he scored his first goal in Ligue 1, contributing to a 6–1 rout of FC Sochaux-Montbéliard.

On 21 February 2014, aged 31, Motta extended his contract until June 2016. In August, he was left with a broken nose after being headbutted by SC Bastia's Brandão in the tunnel, as his opponent went on to be suspended for six months.

Motta announced his retirement for the end of the season on 8 May 2018, while also being appointed as the new coach of PSG's under-19 side. During his six-and-a-half-year stint at the Parc des Princes he played 232 competitives matches and won 19 trophies, making his final appearance on 19 May against Stade Malherbe Caen.

International career

Brazil 
Motta made his debut for Brazil in the 2003 CONCACAF Gold Cup. Although he played with the under-23 team it was a full international competition, hence the international cap won was fully recognized by FIFA; he went on to appear in another two games in the tournament, and previously represented the nation at the 1999 South American Under-17 Football Championship.

Motta missed the 2004 CONMEBOL Men Pre-Olympic Tournament due to injuries, but appeared for the under-23 team in November 2003 against Santos FC. Subsequently, there were claims that he wanted to be called up for Italy and possibly to the 2010 FIFA World Cup, as he possessed dual nationality – his paternal grandfather being Italian. His great-grandfather, Fortunato Fogagnolo, left for South America from Polesella in the early 1900s. FIFA granted players to have one chance to change their representing nation if they had dual nationality, but not for players who have already played in a competitive "A" match (non-friendly).

Italy 

On 6 February 2011, Motta received his first call-up from Italy, for a friendly against Germany, but an official statement from the Italian Football Federation declared it subject to FIFA clearance, which was granted two days later. He made his debut in that match, being replaced in the 63rd minute of the 1–1 draw by Alberto Aquilani.

On 25 March 2011, in only his second international, a UEFA Euro 2012 qualifier in Slovenia, Motta scored the game's only goal following a 73rd-minute combination with Federico Balzaretti. He was selected to the finals in Poland and Ukraine, starting in three group stage matches for the Azzurri and adding two substitute appearances, against Germany in the semi-finals (2–1 win) and Spain in the final; in the decisive match, after having again replaced Riccardo Montolivo, in the 55th minute, he suffered a hamstring injury after only five minutes and had to be carried off, leaving his team with ten players as he was the third and last allowable player brought in by manager Cesare Prandelli – in an eventual 0–4 loss.

Motta was named in a 30-man provisional squad for the 2014 FIFA World Cup on 13 May, and also made the final list. He played his first-ever game in the tournament at the age of nearly 32, coming on in the 57th minute of the 2–1 group stage victory over England.

On 31 May 2016, Motta was named to Antonio Conte's 23-man Italy squad for Euro 2016, and was handed the number 10 shirt. The decision to assign him that number sparked controversy, although international teammate Daniele De Rossi later defended the manager's decision stating: "Those who have joked about it just don't know much about football. Just play the ball around a bit with Thiago Motta and then you will rinse your mouth out. He might not be a No. 10 like [Roberto] Baggio or [Francesco] Totti, but technically he's a master." He was suspended for the quarter-final match against Germany, after being booked for the second time in the competition in the previous round against Spain.

Style of play
A combative player, Motta was usually deployed as either a defensive or central midfielder, but he was capable of playing in various other midfield positions due to his tactical intelligence and versatility. In the Italian national team, under Prandelli, he was on occasion deployed as a deep-lying playmaker or an attacking midfielder, due to his ability to set the tempo of his team's play in midfield with his passing. At Euro 2012, he played in a new role of false attacking midfielder in Prandelli's 4–3–1–2 formation. His role has also been likened to that of a metodista ("centre-half," in Italian football jargon), due to his ability to dictate play in midfield as well as assist his team defensively.

Motta's most prominent traits were his ball control, technique, vision and passing range, although he was also praised for his tackling, ability to read the game and consistent defensive attributes as a ball winner. Due to his physical strength, heading accuracy and ability to make late attacking runs from behind into the penalty area, he excelled in the air, and also possessed a powerful long-range shot; despite his skills, he was also criticised for his aggression on the pitch and his lack of pace.

Managerial career

Early years
Following his retirement from professional football in May 2018, Motta became the new coach of Paris Saint-Germain's under-19 side. In an interview with La Gazzetta dello Sport in November of that year, he stated that he wanted to revolutionise football with a 4–3–3 formation that could be interpreted as a 2–7–2, commenting:

In August 2019, Motta enrolled in the UEFA Pro Licence courses at the Centro Tecnico Federale di Coverciano; he successfully obtained the license on 16 September 2020.

Genoa
On 21 October, his former club Genoa, at the time occupying the second-to-last position in the Italian top tier, announced his appointment as the new manager, replacing the recently dismissed Aurelio Andreazzoli. In his first official match in charge, five days later, he led the team to come from behind and achieve a 3–1 home win over Brescia. With the side in last place, however, he was fired on 28 December.

Spezia
On 5 July 2021, Motta was appointed head coach of Serie A club Spezia, replacing departing manager Vincenzo Italiano following the latter's departure to Fiorentina. With a team widely touted for relegation also due to an impending transfer market ban, and despite a difficult start of season which almost led the club to dismiss him by December, Motta turned Spezia's fortunes by January, and was also awarded the Serie A Coach of the Month award after achieving three consecutive wins.

On 15 May 2022, following a win at Udinese, Motta successfully guided Spezia to escape relegation for the second season in a row with still a game to go. Motta left Spezia by mutual agreement on 28 June 2022.

Bologna
On 12 September 2022, Motta was named new head coach of Serie A club Bologna, replacing Siniša Mihajlović.

Career statistics

Club

International

 Scores and results list Italy's goal tally first, score column indicates score after each Motta goal.

Coaching statistics

Honours

Player
Barcelona
La Liga: 2004–05, 2005–06
Supercopa de España: 2006
UEFA Champions League: 2005–06

Inter Milan
Serie A: 2009–10
Coppa Italia: 2009–10, 2010–11
UEFA Champions League: 2009–10
FIFA Club World Cup: 2010
Supercoppa Italiana: 2010

Paris Saint-Germain
Ligue 1: 2012–13, 2013–14, 2014–15, 2015–16, 2017–18
Coupe de France: 2014–15, 2015–16, 2016–17, 2017–18
Coupe de la Ligue: 2013–14, 2014–15, 2015–16, 2016–17
Trophée des Champions: 2013, 2014, 2015, 2016, 2017
Brazil
South American Under-17 Football Championship: 1999

Italy
UEFA European Championship runner-up: 2012
Individual
Don Balón Award – Breakthrough player in La Liga: 2002–03
Serie A Team of the Year: 2010–11
Ligue 1 Team of the Year: 2013–14

Manager
Individual
Serie A Coach of the Month: January 2022, February 2023

See also 
 List of association footballers who have been capped for two senior national teams

References

External links

1982 births
Living people
People from São Bernardo do Campo
Brazilian people of Italian descent
Brazilian people of Venetian descent
Brazilian emigrants to Italy
Citizens of Italy through descent
Brazilian footballers
Italian footballers
Association football midfielders
Clube Atlético Juventus players
La Liga players
Segunda División B players
FC Barcelona Atlètic players
FC Barcelona players
Atlético Madrid footballers
Serie A players
Genoa C.F.C. players
Inter Milan players
Ligue 1 players
Paris Saint-Germain F.C. players
UEFA Champions League winning players
Brazil youth international footballers
Brazil international footballers
Italy international footballers
Dual internationalists (football)
2003 CONCACAF Gold Cup players
UEFA Euro 2012 players
2014 FIFA World Cup players
UEFA Euro 2016 players
Brazilian expatriate footballers
Italian expatriate footballers
Expatriate footballers in Spain
Expatriate footballers in Italy
Expatriate footballers in France
Brazilian expatriate sportspeople in Spain
Italian expatriate sportspeople in Spain
Brazilian expatriate sportspeople in France
Italian expatriate sportspeople in France
Brazilian football managers
Italian football managers
Paris Saint-Germain F.C. non-playing staff
Serie A managers
Genoa C.F.C. managers
Spezia Calcio managers
Bologna F.C. 1909 managers
Footballers from São Paulo (state)